Inovce is a village and municipality in the Sobrance District in the Košice Region of east Slovakia.

History
In historical records the village was first mentioned in 1555.

Geography
The village lies at an altitude of 495 metres and covers an area of 10.596 km².
It has a population of about 235 people.

Culture
The village has a public library, and its own police force and fire brigade

Genealogical resources

The records for genealogical research are available at the state archive "Statny Archiv in Presov, Slovakia"

 Roman Catholic church records (births/marriages/deaths): 1783-1895 (parish B)
 Greek Catholic church records (births/marriages/deaths): 1824-1851 (parish B)

See also
 List of municipalities and towns in Slovakia

External links
 
http://www.inovce.sk - Official page of village Inovce
http://en.e-obce.sk/obec/inovce/inovce.html
https://web.archive.org/web/20071027094149/http://www.statistics.sk/mosmis/eng/run.html
Surnames of living people in Inovce

Villages and municipalities in Sobrance District
Zemplín (region)